Berryville School District 27 is a public school district based in Berryville, Arkansas, United States. The Berryville School District provides early childhood, elementary and secondary education for more than 1,900 kindergarten through grade 12 students at its four facilities.

Berryville School District and all of its schools are accredited by the Arkansas Department of Education (ADE) and AdvancED.

History 
In 1966 the Carroll County School District dissolved with a piece going to the Berryville district.

Schools 
 Berryville High School—grades 9 through 12.
 Berryville Middle School—grades 6 through 8.
 Berryville Intermediate School—grades 3 through 5.
 Berryville Elementary School—prekindergarten through grade 2.

References

Further reading
 (Download)

External links 
 
 

School districts in Arkansas
Education in Carroll County, Arkansas
Berryville, Arkansas